Robert Georges Jean Héliès (8 February 1927 – 19 February 2019) was a French football referee and player. In his playing days, he was a goalkeeper.

Playing career 
Héliès played 8 matches in 1951–52 French Division 1 for Saint-Étienne.

Refereeing career 
After his playing career, Héliès became a referee, and was member of FIFA from 1966 to 1977. He officiated a total of 13 international matches, with 3 being in World Cup qualifying, 5 in Euro qualifying, 4 friendlies, and a single match at the 1976 Olympic Games.

In club football, Héliès officiated some UEFA competition matches. He was the referee for 7 Champions League games, 12 UEFA Cup games, and 10 Cup Winners' Cup games. He also refereed 270 Division 1 matches from 1962 to 1977, and officiated 2 Coupe de France finals in 1970 and 1975.

References

External links 
 Robert Héliès on WorldReferee.com

1927 births
2019 deaths
Sportspeople from Brest, France
Association football goalkeepers
AS Saint-Étienne players
Ligue 1 players
French football referees
UEFA Champions League referees
UEFA Europa League referees
Footballers from Brittany
French footballers